Captain Sir Humphrey Fleming Senhouse  (29 June 1781 – 13 June 1841) was a British Royal Navy officer. He served in the Napoleonic Wars, War of 1812, and First Anglo-Chinese War. In China, he was the senior naval officer of the British fleet from 31 March 1841 until his death on board his flagship, HMS Blenheim, in Hong Kong from fever contracted during the capture of Canton.

Early life 
Senhouse was born on 29 June 1781 in Barbados, where he was baptised on 23 August 1781 in the Parish of Saint Philip, Barbados. He was the third son of William Senhouse (1741 – 1800) by the same's wife Elizabeth Ward Wood. William, who was a lieutenant in the Royal Navy, was Surveyor-General of Barbados and of the British Leeward Islands. Elizabeth was the daughter of Samson Wood, who was the Speaker of the Barbados Assembly. Senhouse's grandfather, who was also named Humphrey Senhouse, of Netherhall, Cumberland, married Mary, who was the daughter of Sir George Fleming, 2nd Baronet, Bishop of Carlisle.

Senhouse joined the Royal Navy in January 1797 on HMS Prince of Wales, which was the flagship of Rear-Admiral Henry Harvey in the West Indies Station. Senhouse in November 1797 moved to the brig Requin, in which he arrived in England for the first time in 1799. Senhouse from March 1800 to April 1802 served in HMS Fisgard under Captains Thomas Byam Martin and Michael Seymour.

Mediterranean and North America 
On 7 April 1802, Senhouse passed the examination for promotion to lieutenant, and was attached to  two days later. With Israel Pellew, who relieved Louis in April 1804, Senhouse served in the Mediterranean, West Indies, and in the Battle of Trafalgar, until January 1806. He again went to the West Indies on board , and was put on board the flagship of  under Sir Alexander Cochrane.

He was promoted to commander on 2 June. From 1810 to 1812, Senhouse commanded  at Gibraltar, Newfoundland, and the Halifax Station. He then commanded the 18-gun sloop  from 1812 to 1814 in the Halifax Station.

In the War of 1812 against the United States, he defended the Martin, aground in Delaware Bay, against a flotilla of eight gunboats and two blockships on 29 July 1813. He made prize of the 6-gun privateer Snap Dragon containing 80 men, assisted in the capture of Moose Island, and was sent home with despatches by Cochrane, announcing the success of the expedition in Castine, Maine. He was promoted to post-captain on 12 October 1814, and from April to September 1815, commanded  on the coast of France as flag-captain to Sir Henry Hotham. King William IV told Hotham at Windsor:

Sir Henry, you are most fortunate in having one of the cleverest fellows of the navy for your Captain. [...] Yes, I am sure I need not tell you so; he must be not only a clever man, but most zealous in his profession; few like him would have employed the leisure the peace has given him in gaining the information he has; there was not a question I asked him that he could not give me a ready and satisfactory reply. [...] You are lucky in having him.

In July 1831, British warships in the Mediterranean observed smoke caused by the emergence of a volcanic island between Pantelleria and Malta. After being detached in the cutter Hind to ascertain its exact position, Senhouse landed on the island on 3 August, where he planted the Union Jack and named it Graham Island. He was nominated a Knight Commander of the Hanoverian Guelphic Order on 13 April 1832, and made a Knight Bachelor on 5 June 1834.

China 

On 9 April 1839, Senhouse commissioned . He was sent from England to fill the office of second-in-command of British naval forces in China, where he served in the First Anglo-Chinese War. Commodore Gordon Bremer, commander-in-chief of British forces, entrusted the attack on Anunghoy Island to Senhouse in the capture of the Bogue forts on 26 February 1841. After the Blenheim fired broadsides from starboard at the island's fort, Senhouse landed with about 300 marines and seamen to clear the few remaining defenders. On 31 March, Bremer sailed to Calcutta in the steamer Queen to confer with Lord Auckland about the state of affairs and request reinforcements, leaving Senhouse in command of the naval forces.

On 13 June 1841, Senhouse died on board the Blenheim in Hong Kong from fever contracted during the operations in Canton in May 1841. As the next senior naval officer, Captain Thomas Herbert took over command of the ship and fleet. Duncan MacPherson of the Madras Army wrote, "On the morning of the 13th of June, when it was announced to him [Senhouse] that all hopes of saving his life was at an end, he immediately directed that the signal be made for all captains of H. M.'s ships to repair on board; but ere the first had arrived, our gallant commodore was a corpse."

Before he died, he wished to be interred in Macao because of uncertainty about Hong Kong's future as a British settlement. The steamship Nemesis arrived with his body in Macao on 16 June. The next morning, a funeral procession began from Captain Charles Elliot's house. Major-General Hugh Gough, Captain Herbert, Deputy Superintendent of Trade Alexander Johnston, at least 70 military officers, and nearly all the British and foreign residents were in attendance. Also present was the Portuguese governor of Macau, his band who played the funeral march, and a contingent of Portuguese troops who fired three volleys over his grave at the Old Protestant Cemetery.

On 29 June, Senhouse was nominated a Companion of the Most Honourable Military Order of the Bath. It was donated to St Mary's Church in Gosforth by Senhouse's widow in 1844. Mount Stenhouse on Lamma Island is almost certainly named for him, but has acquired a misspelling over time.

Family 

In 1810, Senhouse married Elizabeth, who was the daughter of Vice-Admiral John Manley. She died on 1 March 1865, aged 81. They had two daughters:

Elizabeth Manley, who at Gosforth on 5 October 1843 married Captain Pitman, who had served as Senhouse's aide-de-camp in China.
Rose Mary (d. 11 January 1903)

Senhouse purchased the manor of Seascale in 1834. He built the mansion Seascale (which was later named Steelfield) in Gosforth.

References 
Footnotes

Citations

1781 births
1841 deaths
Barbadian people of English descent
Companions of the Order of the Bath
Knights Bachelor
Royal Navy officers
Royal Navy personnel of the First Opium War
Royal Navy personnel of the Napoleonic Wars
Royal Navy personnel of the War of 1812
People from the Borough of Copeland